Peter Perkins Pitchlynn (January 30, 1806 – January 17, 1881) was a Choctaw chief of Choctaw and Anglo-American ancestry. He was principal chief of the Choctaw Republic from 1864-1866 and surrendered to the Union on behalf of the nation at the end of the Civil War.

Educated in Choctaw culture and American schools, in 1825 Pitchlynn helped found a school for Choctaw boys: the Choctaw Academy in Kentucky. He also worked to reduce the sale of alcohol in their territory. After removal to Indian Territory in the 1830s, he was appointed by the National Council in 1845 as the Choctaw Delegate (akin to an ambassadorship) to Washington, D.C. At the time, the Nation was proposing to be recognized by the US Congress as a territory.

After the war, Pitchlynn returned to Washington, D.C., to represent Choctaw interests and work for concessions from the government for the Choctaw lands sold under pressure to the United States in 1830 during Indian removal. He died in Washington, D.C. and is buried there.

Early life and education
Peter P. Pitchlynn was born in Noxubee County, Mississippi, January 30, 1806 as the first son of Sophia Folsom, a Choctaw of partly Anglo-American descent; her mother Natika was Choctaw and her father was Ebenezer Folsom, an Anglo-American trader. Sophia's Choctaw name was Lk-lo-ha-wah (Loved but lost). Sophia Folsom and John Pitchlynn had married in 1804. As the Choctaw had a matrilineal kinship system of property and hereditary leadership, Peter was born into his mother's clan and people; through her family, he gained status in the tribe.

His father was Major John Pitchlynn, a man of Scots descent. The father was raised from childhood by the Choctaw after the death of his father Isaac, a widower. John Pitchlynn served George Washington as an interpreter for negotiations with the Choctaw.

One of ten children born to the Pitchlynns, after several years at home, Peter was sent to a Tennessee boarding school about 200 miles from Mississippi. Later he attended an academy in Columbia, Tennessee. To complete his education, he studied at and graduated from the University of Nashville, considered one of the finest institutions of the time. It started small like many colleges; its 1827 graduating class held 12 students.

After he obtained his degree, Pitchlynn returned to his family home in Mississippi, where he became a farmer. The Choctaw were among the Southeast tribes that used enslaved African Americans as workers on their farms.

In 1824, Peter Pitchlynn was made the head of the Lighthorse, the Choctaw Nation's mounted police, and among other duties, supervised the removal of whiskey from tribal lands.

Marriage and family
He soon married Rhoda Folsom, a first cousin. As part of changing practices, they were married by a missionary, Reverend Cyrus Kingsbury. They had several children: Lycurgus, Peter P. Jr., Leonidas, Rhoda Mary (married D.L. Kannedy), Malvinia (married Loring S.W. Folsom). After his wife's death, Pitchlynn corresponded regularly with his older children while they were away at school, trying to give them guidance. Lycurgus attended a school in Tennessee and Peter Jr. one in Oxford, Georgia.

The Pitchlynn sons had difficulties as youths and adults: Lycurgus and Leonidas were convicted of assault in 1857 and sentenced to prison. The father gained a pardon for them from President James Buchanan. In 1860, Peter Jr. shot and killed his uncle, Lorenzo Harris, who was married to his father's sister Elizabeth Pitchlynn. Some said it was self-defense.

After Rhoda's death, Peter married a widow, Caroline Lombardy. They had a daughter together, Sophia. She never married and continued to live with her father after her mother's death.

While Pitchlynn was a slaveholder, unlike other Choctaw leaders he felt an indifference towards the institution, and following the Emancipation Proclamation, he cast it aside without protest.

Career

Pitchlynn was well educated in both Choctaw and European-American culture. He began working on ways to improve Choctaw life. He worked to ban the sale of alcohol in Choctaw territory. Believing that education was important, he persuaded the National Council to found the Choctaw Academy, located in Blue Springs, Scott County, Kentucky in 1825. It sometimes accepted students of other American Indian tribes as well as Choctaw, such as Omaha and Sioux boys. Pitchlynn stayed closely involved with the school, receiving quarterly reports.

In 1830 Pitchlynn was elected to the National Council of Choctaw. Because of his education, he served as an interpreter and effective liaison between the Choctaw and the US federal government. He moved with the Choctaw to Indian Territory in the 1830s, where they resettled. Pitchlynn's widowed mother, Sophia Folsom Pitchlynn, moved with her son. After her death, she was buried there, and hers is the oldest known grave in Oklahoma.

English author Charles Dickens was touring the United States when he met Pitchlynn on a steamboat on the Ohio River. He described the Choctaw leader at length:

In 1840 the Council appointed Pitchlynn as a teacher and superintendent of the Choctaw Academy. The following year, they decided to relocate the school to the Choctaw Nation (located in Indian Territory.) Pitchlynn's correspondence shows they were also discussing the need for a girls' school.

Pitchlynn continued to take on more responsibilities for the Nation; in 1845 he was appointed as the Choctaw Delegate to Washington, DC to represent the nation there. That year both the Choctaw and Cherokee proposed to the US Congress that their respective nations should be recognized as independent United States territories, but this was not supported. In 1847, he helped arrange the removal of further Choctaw from Mississippi to the Choctaw Nation by steamboat.

Civil War and Final Years

In 1861, Pitchlynn was in Washington, D.C. to address national affairs of the Choctaw when the American Civil War started, and immediately returned to the Choctaw Nation, hoping to escape the expected strife. He advocated loyalty to the Union or at the very least neutrality in the conflict, (with himself holding pro-Union sympathies) and then-Chief George Hudson sought to maintain Choctaw neutrality. Despite wanting to avoid the war, the Choctaw were not permitted to remain neutral. Following an invasion of Choctaw territory in May 1861 by Texan forces, pro-Confederate elements in the government let by Robert McDonald Jones, the President Pro-Tempore of the Choctaw Senate, threatened Chief Hudson and strongarmed the tribe into an alliance with the Confederacy. The tribal populace was divided by this action: some allied with the Confederacy and others with the Union. All suffered in the aftermath of the war.

Pitchlynn was elected Principal Chief of the Choctaws in 1864 and served until 1866. While in Washington in 1866 to reestablish diplomatic relations with the United States, as well as stave off government-sponsored attempts to colonize Indian Territory, Pitchlynn met with Queen Emma of Hawaii, introduced her to his family and conducted diplomatic cultural exchange. This remains, to date, the only instance of bilateral relations between the Choctaw Republic and the Hawaiian Kingdom.

After he was succeeded as chief by Allen Wright, Pitchlynn returned to Washington, DC as the Choctaw Delegate, where he worked to press Choctaw claims for lands in Mississippi sold under pressure to the United States in 1830. He had been collecting information on this issue since the 1850s from officials involved in the Treaty of Dancing Rabbit Creek. There he joined the Lutheran Church. He also became a prominent member of the Masonic Order. Pitchlynn addressed the President and several congressional committees in defense of Choctaw claims.

After his death in Washington in 1881, Pitchlynn was buried there in Congressional Cemetery. He was the third Native American to be buried there, after his fellow Choctaw chief Pushmataha and the Apache chief Taza.

Pitchlynn was reported to have told of the origin of the Choctaw: 
according to the traditions of the Choctaws, the first of their race came from the bosom of a magnificent sea. Even when they first made their appearance upon the earth they were so numerous as to cover the sloping and sandy shore of the ocean ... in the process of time, however, the multitude was visited by sickness ... their journey lay across streams, over hills and mountains, through tangled forests, and over immense prairies ... so pleased were they with all that they saw that they built mounds in all the more beautiful valleys they passed through, so the Master of Life might know that they were not an ungrateful people.

Legacy and honors
The Choctaw Nation placed a monument at his gravesite in Congressional Cemetery in his honor.
His papers are held by the University of Oklahoma, in the Western Histories Collection.

See also
Apuckshunubbee
Pushmataha
Mosholatubbee
Greenwood LeFlore
List of Choctaw Treaties
Choctaw in the American Civil War

References

Further reading
W. David Baird, Peter Pitchlynn: Chief of the Choctaws, Norman, Oklahoma: University of Oklahoma Press, 1972; reprint 1986

External links
"Peter P. Pitchlynn Collection", Western Histories Collection, University of Oklahoma Libraries
Congressional Cemetery: Native Americans List

1806 births
1881 deaths
19th-century Native American politicians
American Freemasons
American people of English descent
American people of Scottish descent
Choctaw Nation of Oklahoma politicians
Chiefs of the Choctaw
Native American Christians
Native American leaders
Native American slave owners
Native Americans in the American Civil War
People from Noxubee County, Mississippi
People of Indian Territory